Jagbir Jhutti Johal OBE (Punjabi: ਜਗਬੀਰ ਝੂਟੀ ਜੌਹਲ) is a British professor of religion, author and media commentator.

Career 
Jagbir Jhutti Johal is professor of Sikh Studies in the department of theology and religion at the University of Birmingham. 

She is a co-author of The changing nature of Sikh activism research paper looking at second generation Sikh activism published by the UK government in 2019 and also has been a contributor to the UKs ‘New Settlement’ for Religion and Belief which produced the Living with Difference report. 

Jagbir is also regularly featured on the BBC Radio 4 Thought for the Day sharing views on Sikhism and contemporary issues.

In 2022, she was appointed to the Race Equality Foundation Board.

Awards 
She was awarded an OBE in the 2019 Queen's New Honours List for services to Higher Education, Faith Communities and to the Voluntary Sector

References 

British women academics
Living people
Academics of the University of Birmingham

Year of birth missing (living people)